Robin Campillo (born 16 August 1962) is a Moroccan-born French screenwriter, editor and film director. He is known for his work on films such as The Class (2008), Heading South (2005), the French zombie film They Came Back (2004), Eastern Boys (2013), and Time Out (2001), the latter of which was placed at ninety-nine on Slant Magazine's best films of the 2000s, number nine of The Guardian's Best Films of the noughties, and number eleven at The A.V. Club's top fifty films of the 2000s. In 2017, he released 120 BPM (Beats per Minute) which received mass acclaim and went on to garner many awards, including the Grand Prix and 2017
César Award for Best Film.

Filmography

References

External links

1962 births
Living people
French film directors
French male screenwriters
French screenwriters
French-language film directors
French film editors
People from Mohammedia
French gay writers
LGBT film directors
French male non-fiction writers